Amir Ali Ahmad Khan, Shaghasi (1883–1929) was an Afghan king from the Shaghasi family of the Barakzai tribe who was declared king of Afghanistan twice in 1929. He was first declared amir of Afghanistan by and influential cleric, Naqib Sahib on 20 January 1929, in eastern Afghanistan,but was defeated by Kalakani at Jagdalak on 19 February 1929. He was also declared as the amir of Afghanistan for the second time on 23 June 1929 in Kandahar, Afghanistan, by another highly influential Mufti Abd. Wasi Kandahari, but was defeated and captured by Kalakani on 3 July 1929.  

Born in 1883 in Mashhad, Iran, the son of Loinab Khushdil Khan, and grand son of Loinab Shirdil Khan Shaghasi, Ali Ahmad Khan was educated in India and served as chamberlain Isk Aqasi (Shaghasi), of Amir Habibullah Khan. Ali Ahmad Shaghasi played a leading role in negotiating the controversial Anglo-Afghan Treaty of 1919, which ended the Third Anglo-Afghan War and gained Afghanistan its independance.Ali Ahmad Khan Shaghasi later rallied the Khogyani and Shinwari to quell the Khost rebellion, to which he was honoured with the honorary tile of Taj-i-Afghan by king Amanullah. Sometime Minister for Home Affairs1919-1920 and Governor of Kabul 1925-1929, Ali Ahmad also served as high commissioner of the Eastern and Southern provinces.   

During the Afghan civil war of 1928–29, Ali was ordered to quell a Shinwari revolt, which he duly ended in December 1928. Later, after Inayatullah Khan was forced to surrendered control of Kabul to Habibullāh Kalakāni on 17 January 1929, Ali was declared as a lawful Amir of Afghanistan by Naqib Sahib in Jalalabad. However, Ali's reign would prove short-lived: Malik Qays of the Khugyani tribe, who had initially allied himself with Ali, brought Ali to Kalakani in exchange for 17,000 rupees and the rank of lieutenant general, ending Ali's reign on 9 February. Ali later managed to make his ways to King Amanullah in Kandahar, when Kandahar fell to forces loyal to Habibullāh Kalakāni, Ali himself was arrested and sent to Kabul along with Abd al-Shakur Khan (The Chief of Justice), Sad al-Din Khan (Abd al-Shakur Khan's son), and Mufti Abd al-Wasi where he remained imprisoned in Kabul for over a month. Amir Ali Ahmad Khan's life ended by the outlaw-king, Habib Allah, nicknamed "Son of the Watercarrier," with his execution when he was shot from a cannon at Kabul, 11th July 1929.

Ancestry 
Amir Ali Ahmad Khan Shaghasi was son of General H.E. Loinab Khushdil Khan, sometime Governor of Kabul and Kandahar, by his wife Sahira Begum, daughter of H.H. Amir al-Mumenin, Amir al-Kabir, Amir Dost Muhammad Khan, Amir of Afghanistan, by his wife, a daughter of Agha Muhammad Qizilbash.  Ali Ahmad's sister, the Ulya Mukhadara Zarin Jan Begum was the mother of Humaira Begum who was the Queen consort of Afghanistan. Amir Ali Ahmad Khan's grand father, Loinab Shir Dil Khan Shaghasi was a regional Sardar from the reign of Amir Dost Muhammad Khan, especially during 1863 - 1866 and 1868 - 1879, the reign of H.H. Amir al-Mumenin, Amir Sher 'Ali Khan, Amir of Afghanistan, and was related to the Shaghasi royal family of the Barakzai dynasty.

References 

1883 births
1929 deaths
20th-century Afghan monarchs
20th-century executions by Afghanistan
Afghan rebels
Executed monarchs
Executed Afghan people
Afghan Civil War (1928–1929)